The Luoyang Longmen railway station is a railway station part of the Xuzhou–Lanzhou High-Speed Railway. The station is located in Luoyang, Henan, China. It was previous known as Luoyang South railway station.

History
Station construction began on December 9, 2008. Prior to opening, it was renamed from Luoyang South Station to Luoyang Longmen Station on December 15, 2009. Luoyang Longmen railway station opened on February 6, 2010.

Metro Station
Line 2 of the Luoyang Subway opened on 26 December 2021.

See also
Longmen Grottoes
Luoyang railway station

References

Railway stations in Henan
Railway stations in China opened in 2010
Buildings and structures in Luoyang
Stations on the Xuzhou–Lanzhou High-Speed Railway